Steffen Barsch (born 23 June 1967) is a German retired sitting volleyball player who competed at international sitting volleyball competitions. He is a Paralympic bronze medalist, World silver medalist and six-time European medalist. He has competed at the 1992, 1996, 2000 and 2004 Summer Paralympics.

References

1967 births
Living people
Volleyball players from Berlin
German men's volleyball players
Paralympic volleyball players of Germany
Volleyball players at the 1992 Summer Paralympics
Volleyball players at the 1996 Summer Paralympics
Volleyball players at the 2000 Summer Paralympics
Volleyball players at the 2004 Summer Paralympics
Medalists at the 1992 Summer Paralympics
Paralympic bronze medalists for Germany